Lasioglossum halictoides, also known as the Lasioglossum (Nesohalictus) halictoides, is a species of bee in the genus Lasioglossum, of the family Halictidae.

References
 https://www.academia.edu/7390502/AN_UPDATED_CHECKLIST_OF_BEES_OF_SRI_LANKA_WITH_NEW_RECORDS
 https://www.itis.gov/servlet/SingleRpt/SingleRpt?search_topic=TSN&search_value=758529
 http://apoidea.myspecies.info/taxonomy/term/7073/descriptions
 http://animaldiversity.org/accounts/Lasioglossum_halictoides/classification/#Lasioglossum_halictoides

Notes

halictoides
Insects described in 1858